Stanley W. Holmquist (August 23, 1909 – May 15, 2003) was an American businessman and educator. He served in the Minnesota House of Representatives and was a former Minnesota Senate Majority Leader.

Background
Holmquist was born in Hallock, Minnesota. He was the son of Minnesota State Representative, Victor  Holmquist. He attended Minnehaha Academy High School and the Augustana Lutheran Synod Minnesota College. He graduated from the University of Minnesota; B.S.; (1936) and  M.A.; Educational Administration, (1940). He worked as a lumber dealer and in 1942, he started a family owned lumber business. Holmquist later served as Superintendent and Principal of Grove City schools.

Career
He was first elected to the Minnesota House of Representatives in 1946, and later was elected to the Minnesota Senate in 1954.
Holmquist served as the majority leader of the Conservative Caucus in the nonpartisan senate from 1967 until his retirement in 1973.

Personal life
In 1938, he married Edith Maria Johnson, who was the sister of Eleanor Anne Johnson, wife of future Minnesota Governor, Elmer Lee Andersen.

References

1909 births
2003 deaths
People from Hallock, Minnesota
University of Minnesota College of Education and Human Development alumni
Republican Party members of the Minnesota House of Representatives
Republican Party Minnesota state senators
American Lutherans
20th-century American politicians
American people of Swedish descent
20th-century Lutherans